"Never Say Never" is a 1982 song by the new wave band Romeo Void. One of their best-known songs, "Never Say Never" was a favorite on early MTV, featuring a black-and-white music video that spoofs Jean-Luc Godard's Breathless. The song is driven by a throbbing, funky bassline and punctuated by jagged guitar and saxophone, incorporating post-punk influences. The song reached #27 on the Mainstream Rock songs chart in October 1982.

Composition
Musically, the song has been described as post-punk, new wave, and dance-rock.

Legacy
The song was featured in the 1984 film Reckless starring Aidan Quinn as a football star and renegade. Quinn's character takes over the school dance's DJ booth to play the single, much to the dismay of all his classmates. A dance sequence ensues with Quinn's character moshing about while a somewhat distraught Daryl Hannah tries to figure out how to dance with him.

A small segment of the song was featured in a scene of the film Dodgeball: A True Underdog Story.  It also was included in the 2013 film The Wolf of Wall Street.  In 2016, it was featured in the show Ash vs Evil Dead during a scene of the season two episode Trapped Inside.

The song is in Grand Theft Auto: Vice City. It is heard in the game on the radio station Wave 103.

Covers
In 2000 by Queens of the Stone Age, as a bonus track on the album Rated R; the same version was also featured on the soundtrack album of the Thomas Jane film The Punisher (2004). A single was also released in 2000.
In 2009, the band Julien-K covered "Never Say Never" on their debut album Death to Analog, listing the song title as "Nvr Say Nvr".

Never Say Never (EP)

An EP by American new wave band Romeo Void was released in 1981. It was released on CD in 2006 by Wounded Bird Records, as four bonus tracks to their reissue of Benefactor.

All tracks by Debora Iyall, Peter Woods, Frank Zincavage, Benjamin Bossi and Larry Carter.
 "Never Say Never" – 6:06
 "In the Dark" – 4:33
 "Present Tense" – 5:47
 "Not Safe" – 3:57

Personnel
Debora Iyall – vocals
Peter Woods – guitar
Benjamin Bossi – saxophone
Frank Zincavage – bass
Larry Carter – drums, percussion

Chart positions
Single

References

1981 songs
1982 singles
Romeo Void songs
Columbia Records singles
Song recordings produced by Ric Ocasek
1981 debut EPs
415 Records EPs
Black-and-white music videos
Songs written by Debora Iyall